Dendrobium cunninghamii, commonly known as winika, pekapeka, Christmas orchid, bamboo orchid or ladies slipper orchid, is a species of epiphytic orchids that is endemic to New Zealand. It is commonly found growing in rainforest in the North, South, Stewart and Chatham Islands and normally flowers in summer and early autumn.

Description
The rhizomes are similar to the stems and produce many roots. The petals and sepals are white but some parts of the labellum are rose pink, purplish and green. The labellum has three lobes. The side lobes are erect, relatively small and pink or purple and the middle lobe has four or five greenish or yellowish ridges along its midline. Flowering occurs from December to January.

Taxonomy and naming
Dendrobium cunninghamii was first formally discovered in 1835 by John Lindley and the description was published in Edwards's Botanical Register. The specific epithet (cunninghamii) honours Allan Cunningham.

David Jones, Mark Clements and Brian Molloy proposed changing the name of this species to Winika cunninghamii but the change has not been accepted by the World Checklist of Selected Plant Families.

"Winika is the accepted old Māori language name for this orchid. The name Te Winika was given to the sacred war canoe of the Tainui people because this orchid grew on the tōtara tree (Podocarpus totara) which was hollowed out to form the hull. We assign the feminine gender to it—Winika cunninghamii. The Māori Queen, Te Arikinui Dame Te Atairangikaahu, granted consent to use the name Winika, because of its particular cultural significance to her Tainui people."

Distribution and habitat
Winika is usually an epiphyte on forest trees but sometimes also on fallen logs. It sometimes grows on rocks and cliff faces, even on brick or concrete walls. It is found on both the North and South Islands of New Zealand but also on Stewart and Chatham Islands.

Cultural references
In 1990, New Zealand Post released a New Zealand native orchid miniature sheet to support the New Zealand 1990 World Stamp Exhibition held in Auckland.  Winika was one of the stamps (40c) on the miniature sheet.  The others were the sun orchid (Thelymitra pulchella), spider orchid (Corybas macranthus) and greenhood orchid (Pterostylis banksii).

References

cunninghamii
Endemic orchids of New Zealand
Epiphytic orchids
Plants described in 1835
Taxa named by John Lindley